Big Brother was an Indonesian version of the Big Brother reality television show based on the Dutch television series of the same name originally created in 1997 by John de Mol's company Endemol. The show is based on a group of strangers, known as Housemates, living together twenty-four hours a day in the "Big Brother" house, isolated from the outside world but under constant surveillance with no privacy for roughly five months.

The show, sponsored by Telkomsel (under their prepaid service simPATI), premiered on Sunday, 10 April 2011 on Trans TV, airing six times a week. The Daily Show, which shows the activity of housemates, aired from Monday until Friday at 7 pm, and The Deportation Night, which shows who would be evicted, aired on Saturday at 7.30 pm. The host for the daily shows and the deportation night were Indra Herlambang and Sarah Sechan. There are 15 housemates, with Alan winning the first and only season.

During the show, one of the competitors, Luthfie, was disqualified for falsifying his background and identity; he was on the run from charges of embezzlement from Medan police, for which he was convicted of and imprisoned for six months in September 2011.

Format
Housemates are quarantined in the Big Brother House for more than 100 days with no contact to and from the outside world. Each week participants will compete in various challenges, which they must perform to make Big Brother satisfied. Each week, there will be a Captain (Head of Household) who is chosen by another housemates.

For their daily needs in Big Brother House, there are two terms of coin, blue coin and red coin. Blue coins are usually be given for free, but sometimes those be given if Housemates success on the weekly task. Blue coins are used to buy the basic necessities. Red coins usually are given if Housemates win a game or competition. The winner usually receives one until five red coins. Red coins are used to buy the personal necessities. Red coins can only be used by the red coins holder.

Housemates are instructed to nominate two fellow housemates for eviction each week. This compulsory vote is conducted in the "Big Brother Room" and housemates are not allowed to discuss the nomination process or influence the nominations of others. For three housemates received the most nominations, the general public will decide who they want to evict (using SMS polls); the housemate with the most votes is evicted. If one or more participants violate the Big Brother rules, they will also be up for the weekly eviction.

The House
The house is located on Trans TV Studio, beside the Trans Office Tower. The house's construction began in March 2011. More than 50 cameras are mounted in every part of the house.

Housemates
15 housemates entered the house on April 6, 2011.

Notes

Weekly summary

Nominations table 
Each week, housemates are instructed to nominate two fellow housemates for eviction. Housemates may not nominate themselves or the Captain (as the Captain has an immune from eviction) for eviction. Three housemates that received the most nominations will be nominated for the eviction, decided by text message votes by the general public. The housemate with the most votes will be evicted. From the final round, the housemate with the lowest votes will be evicted.

Notes
: There was no eviction in the first week, because Big Brother wanted the housemates to know each other closer.
: Because of a tie between Dey and Derek with three nomination votes, there were four nominations on week 4.
: From this week onwards, a rule change was made where the Captain has the right to nominate one of the housemates for become the nomination with no exception.
: The producers decided to cancel the eviction and void the nominations on the seventh week. No reason was given for this decision.
: The producers decided to cancel the eviction again on the ninth week. No reason was given for this decision.
: Due to the ejection of Luthfie, the eviction process was cancelled on the tenth week.
: Luthfie was ejected from Big Brother House on the tenth week due to lying to the production team about his identity and background.
: Captain must choose two Housemates between Alan, Afrie, Derek, or Rene for nomination.
: There was no eviction on the eleventh week.
: Eviction was changed to be once in two weeks.
: On the night Shinta was evicted, Shinta could choose a Housemate to be automatically nominated; she chose Rene.

Nominations total received

References

External links
 Trans TV Official Site

Indonesia
Indonesian reality television series
2011 Indonesian television series debuts
2010s Indonesian television series
Trans TV original programming
Indonesian television series based on non-Indonesian television series